Bidaoui is a surname. Notable people with the surname include:

 Ahmed El Bidaoui (1918–1991), Moroccan musician and singer
 Soufiane Bidaoui (born 1990), Moroccan professional footballer